East Timor were in the 2017 Southeast Asian Games in Kuala Lumpur, Malaysia from 19 to 30 August 2017.

Competitors

Medal summary

Medal by sport

Medal by date

Medalists

Football

Men's

Volleyball

Men's

Team
Results

References

External links
 

Nations at the 2017 Southeast Asian Games
2017
Southeast Asian Games